Elmes is a surname. Notable people with the surname include:

Cedric Elmes (1909–1995), New Zealand cricketer
Frederick Elmes (born 1946), American cinematographer
Glen Elmes (born 1955), Australian politician
Guy Elmes (1920–1998), British screenwriter
Harvey Lonsdale Elmes (1814–1847), English architect
James Elmes (1782–1862), English architect, civil engineer and writer on the arts
Mary Elmes (1908–2002), Irish businesswoman
Oliver Elmes, British graphic designer
Tim Elmes (born 1962), English former professional footballer
Vic Elmes (born 1947), English guitarists

References